The Takao-class cruisers (高雄型) were a class of four heavy cruisers of the Imperial Japanese Navy (IJN) launched between May 1930 and April 1931. They all served during World War II.

Description

The Takao class were an evolution from the preceding , with heavier torpedo armament and a large, almost battleship-like bridge structure.

Like the Myōkō class, the ships were ostensibly intended to remain within the strictures of the Washington Naval Treaty, initially designed to weigh . This markedly reduced their freeboard and stability. The large tower bridge added to the instability, but the cause of much of the excess weight remains unclear, as many components were heavier than expected.

Their main battery was ten  guns in five twin mounts, for the first time the Mark 2 version of the gun was used during construction, all previous heavy cruisers received it during upgrades. Three of the turrets were located before the bridge in a pyramidal distribution, with the other two aft of the main mast and aircraft handling facilities. After investigation of the recent County-class cruisers of the United Kingdom, it was decided to give the main battery some anti-aircraft ability. The turrets were equipped with increased elevation limits versus their predecessors, 70 degrees in the Takao, Atago, and Chōkai, and 55 degrees in the Maya. The gun elevation gear was improved to achieve a maximum rate of twelve degrees per second. Additional shell lifts were installed to ease supply of AA shells to the main guns. However, it was later realized that these arrangements were inadequate. The elevating gear was considered impractical and delicate (later Japanese heavy cruisers used a reduced 55 degree limit on their guns). Although the elevation rate was better, reloading could be performed only at a fixed five degrees of elevation, which reduced rate of fire at higher angles. The rate of train was still only four degrees per second. Switching of anti-aircraft fire control was found inadequate for the main guns. Finally, the turret machinery was found to be too noisy.

They were also armed with eight  torpedo tubes arranged in four Type 89 twin mounts. A rapid-reload installation was provided, with four twin racks, one per launcher mount. There were sixteen reload torpedoes held in reserve, for a total of twenty-four. After refit in 1938-1939, Takao and Atago were fitted with sixteen  torpedo tubes in Type 92 quadruple mounts. Two quadruple rapid-reload racks were fitted, one each to port and starboard. Arrangements were made to carry Type 93 torpedoes, which were equipped in 1940. Chōkai and Maya did not receive these more extensive modifications, but were refitted with the Type 93 torpedo and oxygen equipment in 1941. Maya was refitted 1943-1944 with sixteen 610mm torpedo tubes in four Type 92 quad mounts, but there were no reloads or rapid-reload racks.

The ships were initially equipped with four single Type 10 12 cm/45 "high-angle" anti-aircraft guns. These cannons were replaced in 1942 on the Takao and Atago with eight Type 89 12.7 cm/40 guns in four twin mounts. They were replaced on Maya with twelve Type 89 12.7 cm/40 guns in six twin mounts during a 1943-1944 refit. Chōkai retained the four Type 10s until it was sunk.

Light anti-aircraft armament comprised two "HI" Type 40mm/62 guns and two "HI" Type 7.7mm machine guns. Both designs were Vickers imports. These guns were progressively replaced and supplemented with Type 93 13mm guns and Type 96 25mm guns during refits.

History 
The Takao-class cruisers were versatile warships and played a major role in many battles during the Pacific War. All four ships were involved in the Battle of Midway although none saw combat, with Atago and Chōkai in Kondō's Midway invasion Force as Cruiser Division (Sentai) 4, Section 1. Takao and Maya, as Cruiser Division 4, Section 2, were a part of the Aleutian Islands campaign as escorts for the Second Carrier Striking Force.

Following Midway, the ships were sent to assist in the Solomon Islands campaign.  While Takao, Maya and Atago were employed primarily escorting aircraft carriers, Chōkai was the flagship of the 8th Fleet and Vice-Admiral Mikawa's strike force at the Battle of Savo Island on 8 August 1942, inflicting what has been credited as the worst blue-water defeat in United States Navy history by sinking three American cruisers and severely damaging a fourth, as well as damaging the Australian cruiser Canberra to the extent that she had to be scuttled.  Although Chōkai took several hits in return, the remainder of the Japanese force received only superficial damage.

In 1943, the four ships spent some time in Japan, then deployed to Truk and New Britain. On 5 November 1943, while anchored in Rabaul harbor, Takao, Atago and Maya were damaged by American aircraft from Rear-Admiral Sherman's Task Force (TF) 38, comprising the carriers USS Saratoga and USS Princeton, escorted by two anti-aircraft cruisers and nine destroyers.  A follow-up attack on 11 November by TF 38 and additional U.S. carriers damaged more Japanese ships, and all three ships had to return to Japan for repairs.  During these repairs, Maya was modified to become an anti-aircraft cruiser.

In 1944, all four ships took part in the Battle of the Philippine Sea, where Cruiser Division 4 was part of C Force, composed of the two superbattleships Yamato and Musashi, two fast battleships Kongō and Haruna, three light carriers, eight heavy cruisers (including the four Takaos), one light cruiser and seven destroyers. The four Takao-class ships were assigned to Vice Admiral Kurita's Center Force for the Battle of Leyte Gulf, or Operation Sho-1 as it was known to the Japanese. The ships left Brunei on 22 October 1944 for what would be their last battle. On 23 October 1944, while passing through the Palawan Passage, the force was attacked by the submarines USS Darter and USS Dace. Darter attacked both Takao and Atago, hitting the former with two and the latter with four torpedoes. Atago was mortally damaged and sank rapidly, although Admiral Kurita survived the sinking. Takao was severely damaged and was escorted to Singapore by two destroyers, but after her arrival would never sail again. Dace sank Maya with a salvo of four torpedoes.

Chōkai, the last remaining ship of Cruiser Division 4, continued with the main force, pulling through the Battle of the Sibuyan Sea unscathed. However, in the later action off Samar she was hit either by 5-inch shells (possibly from the American escort carrier USS White Plains) or by 14-inch fire from a Japanese battleship.  Now crippled, the ship was attacked by American aircraft and stopped dead in the water.  The destroyer Fujinami took off Chōkai's survivors before scuttling the ship on the night of 25 October.  Unfortunately, their trials were not over – on 27 October 1944, Fujinami was attacked by American carrier aircraft, and her torpedoes were detonated by a bomb explosion.  This explosion broke the destroyer in half, sinking with all hands, including the Chōkai survivors.

Ships
Four ships of the class were launched. All served in World War II and all were sunk or disabled by the end of the war.

See also
 Muroc Maru - A bombing practice target resembling a takao-class cruiser

References

Books

External links

Cruiser classes
 
Cruisers of the Imperial Japanese Navy
Ships built in Japan